The El Rancho Unified School District is located in the City of Pico Rivera, California.

School closures
During the summer of 2008, the El Rancho school board voted to close four elementary schools (Pio Pico, Obregon, Selby Grove, Meller) in order to meet the new demands placed upon them by budget cuts and declining enrollment. Along with the school closures, an estimated 80 teachers lost their positions.

Schools

Elementary schools
 Magee Academy of Arts and Sciences
 Durfee Elementary
 North Ranchito Elementary
 Rio Vista Elementary
 Rivera Elementary  
 South Ranchito DLA
 Valencia Academy of the Arts
 Birney Tech Academy

Middle schools
North Park Academy of the Arts
Rivera Middle

High schools
El Rancho High School
Ruben Salazar Continuation HS

Magnet schools
STEAM Academy
Ellen Ochoa Prep Academy

References

External links

Pico Rivera, California
School districts in Los Angeles County, California